Lakewood Fairgrounds, established in 1916 in Lakewood Heights, Atlanta, was built to be the home of the Southeastern Fair.

The Southeastern Fair

There was also a circus big top, arcade games, vendors, and a large carousel that remained on the premises until 1967. It became a popular destination for families in the spring and summer months.  In the wintertime, one of the buildings was "converted into a southern anomaly: an ice skating rink."

Exhibition Halls
Lakewood Fairgrounds's most distinctive feature is its four Spanish colonial-style livestock exhibition halls.
For over twenty years, the Lakewood Fairgrounds Antique Mall was held in the exhibition halls every second weekend of the month. Over 15,000 antique dealers were on hand for the monthly event, until the weekend of October 13–15, 2006, when the Lakewood Antique Market closed its doors for good. The Fairground halls were leased for the Antiques market on as a 50-year lease from the City of Atlanta by Ed Spivia, who promoted it until it was established as an Atlanta icon.

The Greyhound
The main thrill ride at Lakewood Fairgrounds was the Greyhound.  The Greyhound was the old wooden roller coaster that was featured in all three Smokey and the Bandit films.  Designed by John A. Miller, it was in operation from 1915 to 1974.  The Greyhound was out of service during the early part of the 1956 season due to a major rebuild.  After 1974, it sat out of operation for a number of years while the crowds at the fair continued to dwindle around it.  Then, after a final repaint, its destruction was captured on film as a scene in the film Smokey and the Bandit II.

Racing
In the '40s, a dirt track was built around the lake, called Lakewood Speedway and was used for various races.

Film
On May 17, 2010, City of Atlanta Council members voted unanimously to lease  to EUE/Screen Gems, which plans to build a studio complex that will include the soundstage as well as office space, a mill shop and lighting facilities.

The media production company EUE/Screen Gems has a 50-year lease with the City of Atlanta to use Lakewood as a film and TV production studio. The company also has plans to build a  sound stage. The company is currently using the existing historic structures at Lakewood for film and TV production.

References 

 The History of Lakewood: The Legacy Dies photo - L. Burroughs photos at pbase.com
 Henry, Scott: "City banks on Lakewood as ripe for redevelopment", Creative Loafing http://atlanta.creativeloafing.com/gyrobase/Content?oid=oid%3A80151.

Fairgrounds in the United States
Landmarks in Atlanta